Tenggaroh is a mukim in Mersing District, Johor, Malaysia.

Geography
The mukim spans over an area of 178 km2 and consists of 11 villages.

Geology
The mukim also includes the Kerengga Island and Lilang Island.

References

Mukims of Mersing District